Anahí Ester Sánchez (born 21 July 1991) is an Argentine professional boxer. She is a three-weight world champion, having held the IBF female super-featherweight title in 2016; the WBA female lightweight title in 2017; and the WBA female super lightweight title in 2019. She also held the WBA interim female featherweight title in 2015 and the WBA interim female super-lightweight title from 2018 to 2019, and challenged for the WBC and IBF female super-featherweight, and WBC female super-lightweight titles between 2016 and 2019.

Professional career
Sánchez made her professional debut on 15 November 2013, scoring a first-round technical knockout (TKO) victory against Lorena Noemi Gomez at the Gimnasio Municipal in Pergamino, Argentina.

After compiling a record of 6–0 (2 KOs) she faced Maria Soledad Capriolo for the vacant South American super featherweight title on 15 May 2015, at the Gimnasio Municipal. Sánchez defeated Capriolo via first-round knockout (KO) to capture her first professional title.

Featherweight 
After three more wins, one by stoppage, she faced former IBF female featherweight and reigning WBA interim female featherweight champion Dahiana Santana on 14 August 2015 at the Club Comunaciones in Pergamino. Sánchez captured her first title from a major sanctioning body, albeit an interim version, after defeating Santana by a wide unanimous decision (UD) over ten rounds. One judge scored the bout 99–91 while the other two scored it 97–93.

Super featherweight 
She successfully defended her interim title with a third-round TKO against Ana Maria Lozano in November, before facing Areti Mastrodouka for the vacant IBF female super featherweight title on 19 March 2016 at the Club Comunicaciones. Sánchez captured her first full world title, scoring a fifth-round stoppage victory via corner retirement (RTD) after Mastrodouka informed her corner that she no longer wished to continue at the end of the round.

After defending her IBF title with a majority decision (MD) victory against Tamara Marianela Nuñez in July, Sánchez was stripped of the title after it was revealed the promoter of the fight failed to obtain the necessary licences.

In her next fight she challenged WBC female super featherweight champion Eva Wahlström on 17 December 2016 at the Hartwall Arena in Helsinki, Finland. Sánchez suffered the first defeat of her professional career, losing by UD with judges' scorecards reading 98–92 and 97–94 twice.

She bounced back from defeat with a first-round TKO victory against Verena Crespo in March 2017, before attempting to regain the IBF title, she was stripped of, facing reigning champion Maïva Hamadouche on 18 May at the Cirque d'hiver in Paris, France. Sánchez failed in her attempt, losing by fourth-round TKO.

Lightweight 
Following her second professional defeat she moved up a division to lightweight, defeating Maria Carina Brito via first-round knockout (KO). Sánchez' second fight at her new weight came against Cecilia Sofia Mena for the vacant WBA female lightweight title on 9 September 2017 at the Club Defensores de Villa Lujan in San Miguel de Tucumán, Argentina. Sánchez defeated Mena via sixth-round TKO, capturing the WBA title to become a two-weight world champion.

Two days after capturing the WBA title, British promoter Eddie Hearn announced that a deal had been made for Sánchez to face 2012 Olympic gold medalist Katie Taylor on 28 October 2017 at the Principality Stadium in Cardiff, Wales, live on Sky Sports Box Office as part of the undercard for Anthony Joshua vs. Kubrat Pulev (Pulev was later replaced by Carlos Takam). Before the fight, Sánchez was stripped of her title for failing to weigh in under the lightweight limit, meaning the WBA title would only be on the line of Taylor. In a fight which saw Sánchez dropped to the canvas from a left hand to the ribs in the second round, she went on to suffer her third professional defeat, losing by a wide UD with all three judges scoring the bout 99–90.

Super lightweight 
Following the defeat to Taylor, Sánchez once again moved up in weight to the super lightweight division. Her first fight at the weight was a fifth-round KO victory against Ruth Stephanie Aquino in February 2018. Sánchez next fought former world title challenger Diana Ayala for the vacant WBA interim female super lightweight title on 20 April at the Club Comunicaciones. Sánchez defeated Ayala via first-round KO to capture a title in a third division.

After being elevated from interim to full WBA female super lightweight champion, Sánchez faced WBC champion Jessica McCaskill in a unification bout on 25 May 2019 at the MGM National Harbor in Oxon Hill, Maryland. After having success in the first half of the fight, Sánchez went on to lose by a wide UD, with the judges' scorecards reading 98–91, 98–92, and 96–94.

Her next fight was a WBC final eliminator—with the winner securing a shot at former conqueror Jessica McCaskill—against former IBO female lightweight champion Chantelle Cameron on 9 November 2019 at the York Hall in London, England. Sánchez suffered a knockdown in the ninth round en route to a wide UD defeat, with two judges scoring the bout 100–89 and the third scoring it 99–90.

Professional boxing record

References

External links

Living people
1991 births
Sportspeople from Buenos Aires Province
Argentine women boxers
Featherweight boxers
Super-featherweight boxers
Lightweight boxers
Light-welterweight boxers
World super-featherweight boxing champions
World lightweight boxing champions
World light-welterweight boxing champions
World Boxing Association champions
International Boxing Federation champions
People from Pergamino